Into the Void may refer to:

Into the Void (video game), a 1997 strategy game
"Into the Void" (Black Sabbath song), 1971
"Into the Void" (Nine Inch Nails song), 1999
"Into the Void" (Kiss song), 1998
 Into the Void, a 1991 Spelljammer novel by Nigel Findley
"Into the Void" (The Flash), an episode of The Flash

See also 
Enter the Void, a 2009 film